

Group A









Group B









Group C









References

External links
 FIBA Archive

EuroBasket Women 1976
EuroBasket Women squads